Harold Eaid Tanner (December 4, 1892 – June 28, 1982) was a service man, teacher and Canadian politician. He served as an elected representative on both the civic and provincial levels of government in the province of Alberta. He served as an Alderman on Edmonton City Council from 1946 to 1955. He later served as a member of the Legislative Assembly of Alberta from 1952 to 1959 sitting with the Liberal caucus in opposition.

Early life
Harold E. Tanner was born in Tillsonburg, Ontario in 1893. He served overseas with the 49th Battalion in World War I. After the war Tanner moved to Alberta and became a teacher and later a school principal. He worked at schools in Wetaskiwin and Stettler. He moved to Edmonton in 1928 and began working with the public school board until he retired in 1958. Tanner was also President of the Royal Canadian Legion.

Political career

Municipal
Tanner ran for a seat to Edmonton City Council in the 1946 Edmonton municipal election. He won the third place seat out of the six available in the field of thirteen candidate. Tanner first term would only be a year on council instead of the regular two-year term due to a previous Alderman vacating his seat.

Tanner ran for a second term in office in the 1947 Edmonton municipal election. He was very close to finishing in first place in the field of thirteen candidates just 89 votes behind the leader Armour Ford. He won a full two-year term.

Tanner ran for a third term in the 1949 Edmonton municipal election. This time Tanner surpassed Ford in popular vote to head the poles in the nine candidate race.

Tanner ran for a fourth term in office in the 1951 Edmonton municipal election. For the second time, Tanner headed the polls finish first with a commanding plurality over the field of thirteen candidates.

After one year into his fourth term, Tanner won a seat to the Alberta Legislature in 1952. He decided to keep his municipal seat. Tanner ran for re-election to his fifth term in the 1953 Edmonton municipal election. He once again finished in first place easily winning re-election.

Tanner did not re-offer for election leaving city council in 1957.

Provincial
Tanner ran for a seat to the Alberta Legislature while still a municipal councilor in the 1952 Alberta general election as a Liberal candidate in the electoral district of Edmonton. He won the seventh place seat on the final vote count to earn his first term in provincial office.

Tanner ran for a second term in office in the 1955 Alberta general election. He placed significantly better, this time making the vote threshold and winning the fourth place seat.

Tanner retired from provincial politics at dissolution of the Assembly in 1959.

Late life
Tanner moved to Victoria, British Columbia in 1966 and lived the rest of his life there. He died on June 28, 1982. The streets of Tanner Link and Tanner Wynd in the community of Terwillegar Towne Edmonton were named in his honor.

References

External links
Legislative Assembly of Alberta Members Listing

1892 births
1982 deaths
Alberta Liberal Party MLAs
Edmonton city councillors
Canadian military personnel of World War I